HD 86081 is a yellow-hued star in the equatorial constellation of Sextans. It has the proper name Bibha, after Indian physicist Bibha Chowdhuri. The name was suggested in the NameExoWorlds competition by Ananyo Bhattacharya, a mechanical engineering student of the Sardar Vallabhbhai National Institute of Technology Surat. With an apparent visual magnitude of 8.73, this star is too dim to be viewed with the naked eye but can be seen with a small telescope. It is located at a distance of approximately 340 light years from the Sun based on parallax, and is drifting further away with a radial velocity of +31 km/s.

The stellar classification of this star is G1V, which indicates this is a G-type main-sequence star that, like the Sun,  is generating energy through hydrogen fusion at its core. It is bigger and more massive than the Sun at 1.46 and 1.21 solar units respectively. The star is an estimated 3.6 billion years old and is spinning with a projected rotational velocity of 5 km/s. It is chromospherically inactive, with no emission seen in the core of the Ca II H and K lines. HD 86081 is radiating 2.9 times the luminosity of the Sun from its photosphere at an effective temperature of 5,973 K.

Monitoring of this star for radial velocity variations began in November 2005 and the first companion was discovered on April 17, 2006. This hot Jupiter is orbiting just  from the host star and has an orbital period of 2.1 days, one of the shortest periods ever discovered by this technique. The separation of this exoplant is sufficiently low that it may have sped up the star's rotation through tidal interaction. HD 86081 shows no evidence of planetary transits in spite of a 17.6% transit probability. There is a linear trend in the star's radial velocity measurements that may be an indicator of additional unseen companions.

See also
 HD 33283
 HD 224693
 List of extrasolar planets

References

G-type main-sequence stars
Planetary systems with one confirmed planet
Sextans (constellation)
Durchmusterung objects
086081
048711
Bibha